Bulbophyllum maxillare, commonly known as the red horntail orchid, is a species of epiphytic orchid with tapered grooved, dark green to yellowish pseudobulbs, each with a single large, thin leaf and a single reddish flower with yellow or white edges. The lateral sepals are much larger than the dorsal sepal which in turn is much larger than the petals. It grows on the lower branches of rainforest trees in India, New Guinea and tropical North Queensland.

Description
The flower is  reddish to purplish with yellow or white edges. Flowering occurs between July and October in Australia.

Taxonomy and naming
The red horntail orchid was first formally described in 1843 by John Lindley who gave it the name Cirrhopetalum maxillare and published the description in Edwards's Botanical Register. In 1861 Heinrich Gustav Reichenbach changed the name to Bulbophyllum maxillare.

Distribution and habitat 
Bulbophyllum maxillare grows on the lower trunks and branches of rainforest trees on the Andaman and Nicobar Islands, the Malay Peninsula Borneo, Java, the Philippines, Sulawesi, Sumatra, the Solomon Islands, New Guinea and in Australia on Moa Island, Shelburne Bay near Cape Grenville and near the Rocky River.

References

maxillare
Orchids of India
Orchids of Queensland
Orchids of New Guinea
Plants described in 1843